Basketball Club Levski Sofia, simply known as Levski, is a Bulgarian professional basketball club based in the capital Sofia. It is the basketball section of Levski Sofia sports club.

History
Founded in 1923, Levski has won a record 59 honours: 16 NBL titles, 15 Bulgarian Cups and 2 Bulgarian Supercups/Men/ & 8 Bulgarian championships and 13 Bulgarian Cups/Women/. International titles won by the club are: 1 EuroLeague in 1984, 2 EuroCups in 1978 & 1979 and 3 Balkan Leagues (regional European title) in 2010, 2014 & 2018. They play their home matches at the Universiade Hall in Sofia.

In 2018, Lukoil announced its sponsorship deal with Levski. Consequently, the new club name would be Levski Lukoil.

Honours

Men
National Basketball League
Winners (16): 1942, 1945, 1946, 1947, 1978, 1979, 1981, 1982, 1986, 1993, 1994, 2000, 2001, 2014, 2018, 2021
Bulgarian Cup
Winners: (15) 1969, 1971, 1972, 1976, 1979, 1980, 1982, 1983, 1993, 2001, 2009, 2010, 2014, 2019, 2020
Bulgarian Basketball Super Cup 
Winners: (2) 2018, 2019
Balkan League
Winners (3): 2010, 2014, 2018
Runners-up (2): 2012, 2013

Women
Bulgarian Women's Basketball Championship
Winners (8): 1980, 1983, 1984, 1985, 1986, 1987, 1988, 1994
Bulgarian Women's Basketball Cup
Winners (13): 1969, 1972, 1974, 1976, 1977, 1980, 1982, 1983, 1985, 1986, 1987, 1989, 1991
EuroLeague
Winners (1): 1984
Ronchetti Cup / EuroCup
Winners (2): 1978, 1979
Runners-up (1): 1975

Players

Current roster

Notable players

References

External links
 Official website 
 Eurobasket.com BC Levski Sofia Page
 Levski Sofia at Basketball-bg.com 
 Levski Sofia at BulgarianBasket.com 

Levski Sofia
Levski Sofia